Struhařov is name of several locations in the Czech Republic:
Struhařov (Benešov District)
Struhařov (Prague-East District)